Events in the year 2016 in Brazil:

Incumbents

Federal government 
 President: Dilma Rousseff (until August 31), Michel Temer (starting August 31)
 Vice President: Michel Temer (until August 31), vacant (from August 31)

Governors
 Acre: Tião Viana 
 Alagoas: Renan Filho
 Amapa: Waldez Góes
 Amazonas: José Melo 
 Bahia: Rui Costa
 Ceará: Camilo Santana
 Espírito Santo: Paulo Hartung
 Goiás: Marconi Perillo
 Maranhão: Flávio Dino
 Mato Grosso: Pedro Taques
 Mato Grosso do Sul: Reinaldo Azambuja
 Minas Gerais: Fernando Damata Pimentel
 Pará: Simão Jatene
 Paraíba: Ricardo Coutinho
 Paraná: Beto Richa
 Pernambuco: Paulo Câmara
 Piauí: Wellington Dias
 Rio de Janeiro: 
 Rio Grande do Norte: Robinson Faria
 Rio Grande do Sul: José Ivo Sartori
 Rondônia: Confúcio Moura
 Roraima: Suely Campos
 Santa Catarina: Raimundo Colombo
 São Paulo: Geraldo Alckmin
 Sergipe: Jackson Barreto
 Tocantins: Marcelo Miranda

Vice governors
 Acre: Maria Nazareth Melo de Araújo Lambert
 Alagoas: José Luciano Barbosa da Silva
 Amapá: João Bosco Papaléo Paes
 Amazonas: José Henrique Oliveira 
 Bahia: João Leão
 Ceará: Maria Izolda Cela de Arruda Coelho
 Espírito Santo: César Roberto Colnago
 Goiás: José Eliton de Figueiredo Júnior
 Maranhão: Carlos Orleans Brandão Júnior
 Mato Grosso: Carlos Henrique Baqueta Fávaro 
 Mato Grosso do Sul: Rose Modesto
 Minas Gerais: Antônio Eustáquio Andrade Ferreira
 Pará: José da Cruz Marinho 
 Paraíba: Lígia Feliciano
 Paraná: Maria Aparecida Borghetti 
 Pernambuco: Raul Jean Louis Henry Júnior
 Piaui: Margarete de Castro Coelho
 Rio de Janeiro: Francisco Dornelles
 Rio Grande do Norte: Fábio Dantas
 Rio Grande do Sul: José Paulo Dornelles Cairoli
 Rondônia: 
 Roraima: Paulo César Justo Quartiero
 Santa Catarina: Eduardo Pinho Moreira
 São Paulo: Márcio França
 Sergipe: Belivaldo Chagas Silva
 Tocantins: Cláudia Telles de Menezes Pires Martins Lelis

Events

March
March 13 - Hundreds of thousands of people all over Brazil protest against corruption and denounce the government of President Dilma Rousseff.
March 16
Senator Delcídio do Amaral, the speaker of the Worker's Party (PT) signed a plea bargain with Operation Car Wash prosecutor Sérgio Moro disclosing allegations of corruption against other political figures.
Dilma Rousseff appointed former president Luiz Inácio Lula da Silva as her chief of staff, a position that would have made him immune from prosecution. A conversation between them was recorded and later leaked by Sérgio Moro, who was rebuked for the disclosure.

April

 April 17 - Brazil's Chamber of Deputies votes 367-137 in favor of beginning impeachment procedures against President Dilma Rousseff.

May
 May 10 - Senate approves the removal from office of former Worker's Party Speaker Delcídio do Amaral for breaching decorum following his admissions in his March 16  plea bargain agreement.
 May 12 
 The Brazilian Senate voted (55-22) to begin the impeachment process against the President of Brazil Dilma Rousseff and suspend her from office while the trial takes place.
 Vice President of Brazil Michel Temer assumed presidential powers and duties as Acting President of Brazil.
 Temer announces a new Cabinet, exclusively made of white males.
 May 24
Temer announced plans for austerity measures.
Temer planning minister Romero Juca resigned after a recording of him was released in which he appeared to conspire to obstruct justice.

June
June 9 - A bus plunges over a ravine in Brazil's São Paulo state, resulting in at least 18 people killed and 28 injured.

July
July 29 - Former President of Brazil Lula da Silva will stand trial on obstruction of justice charges relating to the Petrobras scandal.

August
August 5–21 - The 2016 Summer Olympics are held in Rio de Janeiro, Brazil.
 August 10 - The Federal Senate votes 59 to 21 to indict suspended President Dilma Rousseff on charges of breaking budget laws and put her on trial.
 August 25 - Brazil's Federal Senate begins the impeachment trial of suspended President Dilma Rousseff.
 August 31 - The Senate votes 61 to 20 in favor of removing Dilma Rousseff from office as President of Brazil. Vice President Michel Temer (who has been acting president since May 12) succeeds to the presidency and serves out the remainder of the term, which ends at midnight January 1, 2019.
 August 31- Economic numbers released showing the Brazilian economy shrank 3.8% year-on-year in the second quarter.

September
September 7–18 - The 2016 Summer Paralympics are held in Rio de Janeiro, Brazil.
September 12 - Eduardo Cunha, former President of the Brazilian Chamber of Deputies, loses his position as a Deputy following a vote of the Chamber as a result of a series of corruption scandals.
 September 14 - Brazilian prosecutors file corruption charges against former President Luiz Inácio Lula da Silva and his wife, Marisa Letícia Lula da Silva. Federal judge Sérgio Moro will preside over his case.
 September 22 - Brazilian police arrest former Finance Minister Guido Mantega as part of an ongoing probe into corruption.
 September 27 - Senator Gleisi Hoffman and her husband were indicted as part of the Operation Car Wash investigation.

October
October 2 - Brazilian voters cast ballots in the nationwide election of mayors and city councils in 5,568 municipalities.
October 5 - Former president Lula da Silva is charged with corruption linked to Odebrecht in Angola.
October 15 - A wildlife sanctuary for rescued elephants opens in Mato Grosso.
October 17 - Clashes between rival gangs in at least two prisons, leave at least 18 people killed.
October 20 - Prosecutors file homicide charges against 21 employees of Samarco, Vale and BHP for the November 2015 iron ore mine dam breach in the state of Minas Gerais which killed 19 people and polluted waterways.

November
November 17 - Former Rio de Janeiro governor Sérgio Cabral is arrested in corruption probe. 
November 20 - Four policemen are killed in Rio de Janeiro after their helicopter is shot down by a gang.
November 21 - Testimony begins in a corruption case against former President of Brazil Luiz Inacio Lula da Silva.
November 23 - The Brazilian Development Bank announces plans to repay up to $29 billion in loans to the Government of Brazil in order to stem a burgeoning deficit.
November 25 - Brazilian Minister Geddel Vieira Lima resigns following allegations he and President Michel Temer pressured a fellow cabinet minister into approving a real estate project.
November 28 - Contractors and suppliers for the Rio de Janeiro Olympic Games claim they are owed millions in unpaid debts.
November 29 
A chartered Avro RJ85 plane carrying 77 people, including the Chapecoense football team, crashes near Medellín, Colombia.  Rescuers report at least six survivors have been found in the wreckage. The 2016 Copa Sudamericana Finals are suspended.
Three of Brazil's leading football clubs – Clube de Regatas do Flamengo, Sociedade Esportiva Palmeiras and São Paulo FC – offer players to Associação Chapecoense de Futebol after the team loses the majority of its squad in the LaMia Airlines Flight 2933 crash.
Protesters in Brasília hold a violent demonstration against a proposed public spending cap. Police used tear gas and rubber bullets in order to disperse the demonstrators.

December
December 1 - Odebrecht apologizes for "illicit actions in business activities".
December 5 - In association football, CONMEBOL officially awards Chapecoense the 2016 Copa Sudamericana title in the wake of the plane crash that killed almost the entire team. Atlético Nacional, which would have faced Chapecoense in the final and had campaigned for the Brazilians to be awarded the title, receives a fair play award from CONMEBOL.
December 13 - The Brazilian Senate passed PEC 55, a constitutional amendment requiring 20-year spending cap, in a 53-16 vote.
December 21 - Brazilian construction firm Odebrecht and affiliated petrochemical company Braskem plead guilty of violating American foreign bribery laws in connection with the Petrobras deal.
December 29 - The Ambassador of Greece to Brazil, Kyriakos Amiridis, is reported missing while on vacation in Rio de Janeiro. A homicide team is investigating his disappearance.
December 31 - A body found in a burnt-out vehicle north of the Brazilian city of Rio de Janeiro is confirmed to be that of missing Greek Ambassador Kyriakos Amiridis. A military police officer who had an affair with the ambassador's wife confesses to the murder. The wife and a second man are also detained.

Arts and culture 
2015–16 Brazil network television schedule

Sports 
2016 in Brazilian football

Deaths
 January 1 – Gilberto Mendes, 93, Brazilian composer.
 January 5 – Antônio Pompêo, 62, Brazilian actor.
 January 11 – Reginaldo Araújo, 38, Brazilian footballer, heart attack.
 January 14 – Shaolin, 44, Brazilian humorist, heart attack.
 January 25 – , 38, Brazilian ultra-distance cyclist, traffic collision.
 February 2 – Luiz Felipe Lampreia, 74, Brazilian diplomat.
 February 15 – Paulo Barreto Menezes, 90, Brazilian civil engineer and politician, Governor of Sergipe (1971–1975).
 March 7 – Ana Luiza Pessoa de Queiroz, 60s, Brazilian fashion agent (Rabih Kayrouz, Anne Valérie Hash).
 March 9 – Naná Vasconcelos, 71, Brazilian jazz percussionist and vocalist, eight-time Grammy Award winner, lung cancer.
 March 17 – Gaúcho, 52, Brazilian football coach and player (Flamengo), prostate cancer.
 March 18 – José Carlos Avellar, 79, Brazilian film critic (Jornal do Brasil).
 March 19 – Roger Agnelli, 56, Brazilian bank and mining executive, CEO of Vale S.A. (2001–2011), plane crash.
 March 25 – Clodomir Santos de Morais, 87, Brazilian sociologist. 
 March 26 – Lucas Gomes Arcanjo, 44, Brazilian police officer and political activist.
 March 28 – Gilson Alvaristo, 59, Brazilian professional cyclist.
 March 31 – Amaury Epaminondas, 80, Brazilian footballer (São Paulo F.C., Deportivo Toluca F.C.).
 April 1 – Petrucio Melo, 65, Brazilian television presenter, cardiac arrest.
 April 7 – , 56, Portuguese-born Brazilian actor.
 April 25 – Patrick Fabionn Lopes, 35, Brazilian football player.
 May 6 - Larry Pinto de Faria, 83, Brazilian footballer (Sport Club Internacional).  
 May 7 – Bernardo Ribeiro, 26, Brazilian footballer (Skënderbeu, Newcastle Jets, IFK Mariehamn).
 May 7 – José Roberto Marques, 70, Brazilian footballer (São Paulo).
 May 15 – Cauby Peixoto, 85, Brazilian singer, pneumonia.
 May 30 – Gérson Bergher, 91, Brazilian politician.
 June 5 – Jarbas Passarinho, 96, Brazilian politician, President of the Senate (1981–1983), Governor of Pará (1964–1966).
 June 6 – Hélio Garcia, 85, Brazilian politician, Governor of Minas Gerais (1984-1987, 1991-1995).
 June 6 – Tunga, 64, Brazilian sculptor and performance artist.
 June 9 – Carillo Gritti, 74, Italian-born Brazilian Roman Catholic prelate, Territorial Prelate of Itacoatiara (since 2000).
 June 24 – Francisco Ivens de Sá Dias Branco, 81, Brazilian billionaire businessman.
 June 27 – Luís Carlos Melo Lopes, 61, Brazilian footballer.
 June 28 – Fabiane Niclotti, 31, Brazilian model, Miss Universo Brasil 2004.
 July 2 – Irineu Roque Scherer, 65, Brazilian Roman Catholic prelate, Bishop of Garanhuns (1998–2007) and Joinville (since 2007).
 July 4 – Rondon Pacheco, 96, Brazilian politician, Governor of Minas Gerais (1971–1975), pneumonia.
 July 7 – Guilherme Karan, 58, Brazilian actor (Super Xuxa contra Baixo Astral, Xuxa e os Duendes, Meu Bem, Meu Mal, TV Pirata), Machado–Joseph disease.
 July 13 – Héctor Babenco, 70, Argentine-born Brazilian film director, producer and screenwriter (Kiss of the Spider Woman, Ironweed, Carandiru), heart attack.
 July 13 – Celso Peçanha, 99, Brazilian politician, Governor of Rio de Janeiro (1961–1962).
 July 17 – Sérgio Henrique Ferreira, 82, Brazilian scientist.
 August 5 – Vander Lee, 50, Brazilian singer-songwriter.
 August 6 – Ivo Pitanguy, 90, Brazilian plastic surgeon, natural causes.
 August 16 – Luis Álvaro de Oliveira Ribeiro, 73, Brazilian businessman, president of Santos FC (2010–2014).
 August 16 – João Havelange, 100, Brazilian football executive, ex-president of FIFA.
 August 16 – Elke Maravilha, 71, Brazilian actress.
 August 22 – Geneton Moraes Neto, 60, Brazilian writer and journalist, aortic aneurysm.
 August 23 – Antônio Eliseu Zuqueto, 86, Brazilian Roman Catholic prelate, Bishop of Teixeira de Freitas-Caravelas (1983–2005).
 August 23 – , 83, Brazilian television host and journalist.
 August 27 – Alcindo, 71, Brazilian footballer (Grêmio), diabetes.
 September 3 – Claudio Olinto de Carvalho, 74, Brazilian football player and coach.
 September 15 – Domingos Montagner, 54, Brazilian actor, drowning.
 October 14 – Orival Pessini, 72, Brazilian actor (A Praça É Nossa, Balão Mágico), comedian, plastic artist and creator of character Fofão, spleen cancer.
 October 25 –  Carlos Alberto Torres, 72, Brazilian footballer and manager, world champion (1970), heart attack.
 November 6 – Redovino Rizzardo, 77, Brazilian Roman Catholic prelate, Bishop of Dourados (2001–2015).
 November 20 – Diógenes da Silva Matthes, 83, Brazilian Roman Catholic prelate, Bishop of Franca (1971–2006).
 November 29 – Notable people killed in the LaMia Airlines Flight 2933 crash:
Ananias, 27, Brazilian football player (Chapecoense).<ref
name="nbcnews1"/>
Mateus Caramelo, 22, Brazilian football player (Chapecoense).<ref
name="nbcnews1"/>
Dener, 25, Brazilian football player (Chapecoense).<ref
name="nbcnews1"/>
Guilherme Gimenez de Souza, 21, Brazilian football player (Chapecoense).<ref
name="nbcnews1"/>
Josimar, 30, Brazilian football player (Chapecoense).<ref
name="nbcnews1"/>
Caio Júnior, 51, Brazilian football player and manager (Chapecoense, Vitória de Guimarães).
Filipe Machado, 32, Brazilian football player (Chapecoense, CSKA Sofia).
Arthur Maia, 24, Brazilian football player (Chapecoense, Vitória)<ref
name="nbcnews1"/>
Bruno Rangel, 34, Brazilian football player (Chapecoense).<ref
name="nbcnews1"/>
Cléber Santana, 35, Brazilian football player (Chapecoense, Atlético Madrid).
Marcos Danilo Padilha, 31, Brazilian footballer (Chapecoense)
Mário Sérgio Pontes de Paiva, 66, Brazilian footballer, manager and commentator (Fox Sports).
, 51, announcer (Fox Sports).
Paulo Julio Clement, 51, commentator (Fox Sports).
Victorino Chermont, 43, reporter (Fox Sports).
 December 4 – Ferreira Gullar, 86, Brazilian writer, essayist and art critic, pneumonia.
 December 8 –Lélis Lara, 90, Brazilian Roman Catholic prelate, Bishop of Itabira–Fabriciano (1996–2003).
 December 9 – Élcio Álvares, 84, Brazilian politician, Senator (1991–1994, 1995–1999), Minister of Defence (1999–2000), and Governor of Espírito Santo (1975–1979).
 December 10 – Damião Experiença, 81, Brazilian outsider musician.
 December 11 – João Castelo, 79, Brazilian politician, Governor of Maranhão (1979–1982), complications from surgery.
 December 14 – Paulo Evaristo Arns, 95, Brazilian Roman Catholic prelate, Cardinal (since 1973) and Archbishop of São Paulo (1970–1998), complications from pneumonia.
 December 23 – Alida Victoria Grubba Rudge, 113, Brazilian supercentenarian, nation's oldest person.
 December 27 – Mariza Corrêa, 71, Brazilian anthropologist.

See also

2015 in Brazil
2016 in Brazilian football
2017 in Brazil
Mensalão scandal
Timeline of the Mensalão scandal

References

 
2010s in Brazil
Brazil
Brazil
Years of the 21st century in Brazil